Duhamel-Ouest is a municipality in northwestern Quebec, Canada in the Témiscamingue Regional County Municipality.

Located at a narrows of Lake Timiskaming, Duhamel-Ouest is home to the Fort Témiscamingue, a National Historic Site of Canada.

Demographics
Population trend:
 Population in 2021: 945 (2016 to 2021 population change: 7.6%)
 Population in 2016: 878 
 Population in 2011: 828 
 Population in 2006: 870
 Population in 2001: 766
 Population in 1996: 671
 Population in 1991: 595

Private dwellings occupied by usual residents: 394 (total dwellings: 470)

Mother tongue:
 English as first language: 2.9%
 French as first language: 97.1%
 English and French as first language: 0%
 Other as first language: 0%

See also
 List of municipalities in Quebec

References

Municipalities in Quebec
Incorporated places in Abitibi-Témiscamingue
Témiscamingue Regional County Municipality